The three dozen East Chadic languages of the Chadic family are spoken in Chad and Cameroon.

Speakers of various East Chadic languages are locally known as Hadjarai peoples.   The largest East Chadic language is Nancere.

Languages
The branches of East Chadic go either by names or by letters and numbers in an outline format.

The East Chadic B classification follows that of Lovestrand (2012).

East Chadic A
Sibine (A.1.1): Mire, Ndam, Somrai, Tumak, Motun, Mawer
Miltu (A.1.2): Boor, Gadang, Miltu, Sarua
Nancere (A.2.1): Nancere, Kimré, Lele
Gabri (A.2.2): Gabri, Kabalai, Tobanga
Kwang (A.3): Kwang, Kera
East Chadic B
B.1
Dangla (B.1.1): Bidiyo (Bidiya), Dangaléat (Dangla), Birgit, Jonkor Bourmataguil, Mabire, Migaama, Mogum (Jegu), Toram
Mubi (B.1.2): Mubi, Kajakse, Masmaje, Zirenkel (Zerenkel)
? Kujargé (B.1.3)
Mokilko (Mukulu, Gergiko) (B.2)
Sokoro (B.3): Saba, Sokoro, Tamki, Mawa, Ubi
Barein (Baraïn) (B.4, including the Jalking or Jelkung dialect)

Peust (2018), however, has a somewhat different phylogenetic classification for East Chadic.  The most striking change is the repositioning of Mokilko (B.2) from East Chadic B to East Chadic A, where it now constitutes the first branch to separate, followed by Lele-Nancere (A.2.1). Within East Chadic B, he treats the Mubi group (B.1.2) as the first primary branching, with all the rest forming a subgroup divided between Dangla (B.1.1) in the north and Barain plus Sokoro (B.3 and B.4) in the south.

East Chadic A is distributed primarily in Tandjilé and neighbouring regions. East Chadic B is distributed primarily in Guéra and neighbouring regions.

Numerals
Comparison of numerals in individual languages:

References 

 
Chadic languages
Languages of Chad